Chris Easterly is an American screenwriter and television writer. He has written for the television series Past Life, Unnatural History and the television films Click Clack Jack: A Rail Legend and The Shunning.

Easterly is a native of Frankfort, Kentucky and is a graduated from the University of Kentucky. He is a Catholic. He has also written a book "Falling Forward: A Man's Memoir of Divorce"

References

External links

American male screenwriters
American television writers
Living people
People from Frankfort, Kentucky
University of Kentucky alumni
Year of birth missing (living people)
American male television writers
Catholics from Kentucky
Screenwriters from Kentucky